Pawan Singh Chauhan (born February 3, 1965) is an Indian politician from Bhartiya Janata Party. He has been a member of the Uttar Pradesh Legislative Council from  Sitapur since 2022. And he is the Chairman of SR Group.

Early life and career

He was born on 3rd February 1965 in Lucknow, the capital of Uttar Pradesh. He also worked as a tea seller in his childhood. His son's name is Piyush Singh Chauhan, Vice Chairman of SR Group Of Institution, Lucknow.

References

1965 births
Living people
Politicians from Lucknow
Members of the Uttar Pradesh Legislative Council
Bharatiya Janata Party politicians from Uttar Pradesh
Uttar Pradesh politicians